The Souss-Massa National Park (Parc National de Souss-Massa) is a 33,800 hectare national park on the Atlantic coast of Morocco which was created in 1991. It lies between Agadir to the north and Sidi Ifni to the south and its centre is at 9°40'W 30°5'N. The estuary of the Oued Souss is the northern limit of the park, and that of the Oued Massa is near the southern end. 30,000 ha of land near Aglou, south of the park, is also included in the site because it is sometimes used as a feeding area by the northern bald ibis. The habitat is grazed steppe with dunes, beaches and wetlands. The soil is mainly sandy with some rockier areas.

Fauna
The park's main conservation importance is that it holds three of the four Moroccan colonies of the northern bald ibis (Geronticus eremita). Together with the fourth site at nearby Tamri, it holds 95% of the world's truly wild breeding birds of this endangered species. The ibis colonies and roost-sites are located on coastal cliffs within the National Park, and the coastal steppes and fields are used as feeding areas. The park has a nature trail at Oued Souss and a visitor centre at Oued Massa.

The Oued Massa holds water throughout the year and has breeding marbled ducks, a globally threatened species. It is the only known Moroccan breeding site for the glossy ibis. The two estuaries are important for migrants, especially waders and gulls. European spoonbill  and Audouin's gull winter in the park. Other notable breeding bird species are red-necked nightjar, thick-billed lark, Tristram's warbler and Moussier's redstart.

Souss-Massa also holds captive-breeding programmes for four threatened North African ungulates: scimitar oryx, addax, dama gazelle and dorcas gazelle, that are kept in separate enclosures within the park. The reintroduction of the North African ostrich - which is extinct north of the Sahara - is also underway.

Threats
The park is threatened by increasing pressures of the growing human population and the construction of summer chalets is increasing around Aglou. A large-scale hotel development planned for the coast at Tifnit, an area that includes important feeding areas for the bald ibis, has been suspended.

International cooperation
In regard to international cooperation and exchanges, the Souss-Massa National Park has received technical support from the Teide National Park (Tenerife, Spain).

See also
Massa River
Northern bald ibis

References

National parks of Morocco
Geography of Souss-Massa
Protected areas established in 1991
Biosphere reserves of Morocco
Ramsar sites in Morocco
1991 establishments in Morocco